The Presbyterian Church of Vanuatu, or the Presbitirin Jyos Blong Vanuatu in Bislama, is the largest Christian denomination in Vanuatu.

History
It was created by missionaries of the London Missionary Society in the mid-1800s. In 1838 Rev John William arrived on the Island of Futuna. In Eromango Rev. William was martyred and eaten. In 1841 Apela and Samuele were placed to Futuna. Both of them were martyred. They prepared the way for Presbyterians from Canada, Scotland, Australia, and New Zealand. The Presbyterian Mission Synod contributed to the mission in the New Hebrides. Two prominent missionaries were John Gibson Paton from Scotland and John Geddie from Nova Scotia. Even today the Scottish Presbyterian tradition is visible in the life of the Vanuatuan church. The church developed rapidly from the south to the north. It employed indigenous pastors and teachers. The church become autonomous in 1948 as the Presbyterian Church in the New Hebrides. Vanuatu became free from British and French colonization in 1980. Most of the members of the new government were Presbyterians, because the Presbyterian church is the only denomination that established a theological seminary and concentrated on educating the Ni-Vanuatu people.

Statistics
The denomination has approximately 78,000 members and 400 congregations, as well as 450 house fellowships in 6 presbyteries as of January 1, 2006. It is the largest denomination in the country, representing more than 30% of the population of Vanuatu.  

The PCV (Presbyterian Church of Vanuatu) is headed by a moderator with offices in Port Vila. The PCV is particularly strong in the provinces of Tafea, Shefa, and Malampa. The Province of Sanma is mainly Presbyterian with a strong Roman Catholic minority in the Francophone areas of the province. There are some Presbyterian people, but no organised Presbyterian churches in Penama and Torba, both of which are traditionally Anglican. Vanuatu is the only country in the South Pacific with a significant Presbyterian heritage and membership.

The church runs schools. PCV ministers are trained in the Presbyterian's official theological institute, the Talua Ministry Training Centre on South Santo. It offers diploma of theology, diploma of mission and Bachelor of Ministries Programs. Graduates from the college become church leaders in various denominations and evangelists to isolated islands.

Doctrine
The Presbyterian Church in Vanuatu affirms the Apostles Creed and Westminster Confession of Faith.

Interchurch relations
The Presbyterian Church of Vanuatu is a member of the World Communion of Reformed Churches.

The Presbyterian Church in Vanuatu has partner relations with the Presbyterian Church of Australia. The Australian church supports the Talua Ministry Training Centre, which provides the ministry training of the Presbyterian Church in Vanuatu.

References

External links
 Official website

Presbyterian denominations in Oceania
Churches in Vanuatu
Presbyterianism in Vanuatu
Members of the World Communion of Reformed Churches
Christian organizations established in 1948